Ismail Balanga is a South Sudanese professional football manager.
2014-2015:Black peril FC/Botswana
2016-2017:Cercle de Joachim FC/Mauritius.

Career
From November until December 2013, Balanga coached the South Sudan national football team.

References

Year of birth missing (living people)
Living people
South Sudanese football managers
South Sudan national football team managers
Place of birth missing (living people)